Manuel Quintín Lame Chantre (1880–1967) was a Colombian indigenous rebel from the early 20th century who tried to form an independent indigenous republic.

He was born in El Borbollón, Cauca, son of Mariano Lame, of Paez origin, and Dolores Chantre, of mixed indigenous origins. During the war of 1885, his sister Licenia, was raped.  His brother Feliciano was killed in the Thousand Days' War. In 1901, he joined the army of the Colombian Conservative Party. In 1911, he started the Indigenous Movement. In 1914, he tried to establish the Republic of Indigenas, formed by Cauca, Tolima, Huila and Valle. Because of this, he was arrested. His movement grew and became the "Guerra Racial". In 1921, after spending three years in jail, he joined the Tolima movement. In 1924, he wrote the book El pensamiento del indio que se educó en las selvas colombianas. He died in 1967 in Ortega, Tolima.

Bibliography 
 LAME CHANTRE, Manuel Quintín. Los pensamientos del indio que se educó en las selvas colombianas [1939]. Bogotá, Funcol, s.f. 
 LAME, MANUEL QUINTÍN. Las luchas del indio que bajó de la montaña al valle de la "civilización". Selección y notas, Gonzalo Castillo Cárdenas. Bogotá, Rosca de Investigación y Acción Social, 1973. 
 TELLO, Piedad, LAME, MANUEL QUINTÍN, in Gran Enciclopedia de Colombia del Círculo de Lectores, tomo de biografías 
 TELLO, Piedad L. "Vida y lucha de Manuel Quintín Lame". Tesis de Grado, Departamento de Antropología, Universidad de los Andes, Bogotá, 1983.
 CASTRILLÓN ARBOLEDA, Diego. El Indio Quintín Lame. Bogotá, Tercer Mundo, 1971.

1880 births
1967 deaths
Indigenous activists of the Americas
Colombian activists
Colombian military personnel
Colombian rebels